is railway station  operated by West Japan Railway Company (JR West) in Miyoshi, Hiroshima, Japan.

Lines
Shimowachi Station is served by the Geibi Line from Hiroshima.

Station layout
The station consists of a single side platform. It formerly had an island platform in addition to the station-side platform, but the island platform has since been decommissioned. The station is unstaffed.

History
The station first opened on 8 December 1923 as Wadamura Station. It was renamed Shimowachi Station on 1 June 1933. The station became a JR West station from 1 April 1987 following the privatization of Japan National Railways (JNR).

Surrounding area
Shimowachi Station is located about halfway between Shōbara, Hiroshima, and Miyoshi. The Kunikane River is located near the station, as is the Wada Branch Post Office.

There were three old castles, such Teramachi old castle at Mt. Terayama, Kunihiro old castle at Mt. Kunihiro, and Eta old castle at Mt. Jinyama after Genji and Heike battle in the Kamakura period. These castles were constructed by Eta and Wachi family assigned district manager by the Kamakura Bakufu. These castles remain only as stones at the top of the mountains.

Highway access
Japan National Route 183
Hiroshima Prefectural Route 431 (Wachi Shiomachi Route)
Hiroshima Prefectural Route 434 (Wachi Miyoshi Route)

External links
 JR West 

Railway stations in Japan opened in 1923
Geibi Line
Railway stations in Hiroshima Prefecture